Vera Shvetsova (1929, Cherepovets, Russia) is a ballet teacher and balletmaster. She was trained by the famous teacher Vaganova and was one of Vaganova’s best students.

Like her teacher, Shvetsova worked in several colleges, conservatories, and academies of dance in different countries (Poland, Germany, Hungary, etc.), including at The College of Ballet and Choreography in Minsk, (Belarus),
She danced in The Mali of Saint Petersburg (Russia) and The Great Theater of Opera and Ballet of Riga, Latvia (The Latvian National Opera in our time)

Famous pupils: Tatiana Stepanova, Andrei Rimashevsky, Liliya Ruhukya and others.

Prizes and awards 
 1958: Emerite Artist of Latvia

References
 Grigorovich, Yuriy Nikolayevich (1981). Balet Entsiklopediya, Moskva: Izdatelstvo "Sovetskaya Entsiklopediya". .

External links
Official site of The Latvian National Opera (in Latvian and English languages)

Ballet teachers
Ballet masters
Russian ballerinas
1929 births
Living people